Michelle Lopez (born in 1970 of Filipino descent) is an American sculptor and installation artist, whose work incorporates divergent industrial materials to critique present day cultural phenomena. She lives and works in Brooklyn, New York.

Biography
Michelle Lopez received her B.A. in literature and art history in 1992 at Barnard College, and received her M.F.A in 1994 at The School of Visual Arts. She has had solo exhibitions at Feature Inc., Deitch Projects, ICA Philadelphia, Simon Preston Gallery, Fondazione Trussardi, LA >< Art, and the Aldrich Contemporary Museum of Art (2014). She has been in group exhibitions at the Brooklyn Museum, PS 1/MOMA, Yerba Buena Center for the Arts, and Artist Space. Public Sculptures include projects with the Public Art Fund and Miami Basel Art Public (Bass Museum, Miami, 2013). Other recent group exhibitions include ‘You Just Fit, You and I,’ Harvard Carpenter Center for the Arts (2017); ‘Re-Enactments,’ Museum of Contemporary Art & Design (MCAD), Manila, Philippines (2017).

In 2007, Lopez participated in a curatorial project with Grimm/Rosenfeld and wrote an essay on sculpture titled
Exit Music (for a Film). She was awarded the NYFA Fiscal Sponsorship Grant in 2009 and was a recipient of the New York Foundation for the Arts Sculpture Fellowship in 2010. In 2019, she earned a Guggenheim fellowship in the category of Fine Arts.

In a Frieze review, Morgan Falconer describes Lopez's sculpture as "marvelously poised between being one strange thing and something stranger still."
Michael Wilson of Artforum reviewed Blue Angels when the series appeared at Simon Preston Gallery in New York: “Turning Minimalist form against itself is hardly a new idea-one might even consider, it a genre unto itself- but it still offers room for maneuver. In Vertical Neck, her second solo exhibition at Simon Preston, Brooklyn-based artist Michelle Lopez presented a strong, clean suite of five new sculptures that capitalize on the movement’s enduring legacy but sidestep parody and polemic to arrive at a more subtly allusive language.... Three roughly folded and heavily crumpled sheets of aluminum lean against the wall and tower above head height, their interiors painted blue or black, their exteriors white or colorlessly reflective. The suggestion that attempts at formal perfection are necessarily doomed to failure is clear, but in their fun-house-mirror distortions, these works direct that argument at not only artistic folly but also the viewer’s own vanities and imperfections. Still, the news isn’t all bad; there’s an insinuation in the aluminum’s shiny. paper- like surfaces of gift wrap, a hint of celebration and renewal.... [T]here is a hint of nose-thumbing at the consistent anality of the Guys, but Lopez's remake is more understated, more extensive, more radical-and a lot more appealing-than that might imply." (Artforum, November 2011)

Lopez first gained critical attention with her sculpture Boy; a leather covered Honda that made its debut in 2000 as part of P.S.1 / MoMA’s Greater New York exhibition. Her work examines cultural phenomena related to fanaticism, violence, and questions of identity. Lopez' artistic process looks at post 9/11 experience and its abject residue on the sculptural object. Such forlorn themes can be found in "Blue Angels", "The Year We Made Contact", "Strange Fruit", "Banner Year". 

In her Smoke Clouds work, Lopez explores themes of disappearance through the shifting image within the material of silver nitrate (mirroring solution) poured onto large-scale architectural glass. Lopez' mirrored smoke clouds reflect the room and the viewer through the original photographic process of silver tinning. The cloud image appears and disappears as a "puff of smoke" depending on the environment and the viewers position in the room. Lopez questions the status of the object and the artistic desire to make iconography, while also questioning the viewer's desire to claim it. Her sound and kinetic installation, Halyard, is a further iteration of examining invisible structures of power. House of Cards, an installation of an abject collapsing scaffolding system, employs steel rope and street rubble to lift spare minimal lines, as if forms of resistance could actually overcome the well-grooved forms of oppression. Reflecting the current social and political climate, her most recent work, Ballast & Barricades, suspends a thousand-pound building fragment by using remnants of cultural signifiers such as scaffolding for falling and climbing ladders as counter weight, creating a state on the verge of collapse.

Formerly a faculty member at Yale School of Art in the Department of Sculpture,
Lopez is now faculty in the Fine Arts Program at The School of Design, University of Pennsylvania and leads the Sculpture Division.

References

External links
 'NINA IN POSITION' By Holland Cotter, New York Times, February 15, 2008.
 Michelle Lopez at Simon Preston by Morgan Falconer, Frieze Magazine, 2008.
 The Violent Bear It Away Catalogue, essays by Carissa Rodriguez and Jeffrey Uslip, 2009.
 Review of Vertical Neck, NY by Michael Wilson, Artforum Magazine, 2011.
 Review of Vertical Neck Show, by Kathleen Madden, Artforum picks, 2011.
 Michelle Lopez's artist profile page on the Simon Preston Gallery website.
 Review of work, Howard Hurst, 2011.
 Review of work, Blake Gopnik, 2011.
 Aldrich Catalogue, by Amy Smith-Stewart, "Angels, Flags, and Bangs", Aldrich Museum of Art Catalogue, 2014.
 Michelle Lopez faculty Yale, 2012–2017
 Michelle Lopez faculty UPenn School of Design, 2016–present
 Guggenheim Fellowship Fine Arts, 2019
 Ballast & Barricade ICA Philadelphia, 2019-2020.
 Collapse and Equilibrium by Olivia Gauthier, BOMB Magazine, April 15, 2020.
 Ephemeral Building Structures in conversation with Michael Queenland, Mousse Magazine, 2020.
 Review of Ballast & Barricade by Kari Rittenbach, Frieze, January 15, 2020.
 www.michellelopez.com, artist website

1970 births
Living people
Artists from Brooklyn
Barnard College alumni
Sculptors from New York (state)